Efficiency Decoration may refer to:
Efficiency Decoration (Canada)
Efficiency Decoration (New Zealand)
Efficiency Decoration (South Africa)
Efficiency Decoration (United Kingdom)
Territorial Decoration.